Polina Barskova (born 1976) is a Russian poet. She was born in Leningrad (today St. Petersburg). She started publishing her work at the age of nine, and her first book appeared when she was still a teenager, At the age of 20, she left Russia to pursue a PhD at UC Berkeley. She taught Russian literature at Hampshire College, and is now a professor at U.C. Berkeley. 

She has published several volumes of poetry, and she has been nominated for the Debut Prize and the Andrei Bely Prize in her native Russia. Her selected poems have appeared in English translation under the title The Zoo in Winter. Her work has also appeared in anthologies such as The Ecco Anthology of International Poetry, co-edited by Ilya Kaminsky. Kaminsky also translated a short volume of her poems This Lamentable City (Tupelo Press, 2010). She has done extensive archival work on the literature of the siege of Leningrad, resulting in the award-winning volume Written in the Dark: Five Poets in the Siege of Leningrad (Ugly Duckling Presse, 2016).

Books in English translation
 This Lamentable City (Tupelo Press, 2010)
 The Zoo in Winter (Melville House Press, 2011)
 Relocations (Zephyr Press, 2013)
 Living Pictures (New York Review Books Classics, 2022).

References

 
1976 births
Living people
21st-century Russian poets
Russian women poets
University of California, Berkeley alumni
Hampshire College faculty
Writers from Saint Petersburg
Russian emigrants to the United States